Australia A is the second national Rugby union team of Australia, behind the  Wallabies. Matches played under the 'Australia A' title are traditionally non-test match fixtures and often offer a stepping-stone to Wallaby national selection. Aspiring Wallaby players were given a chance to impress selectors during these games. In the past, the team would also play touring sides, such as the British & Irish Lions, or play mid-week games when the Wallabies are on tour.

History
Officially formed in 2001 as part of the 2001 British & Irish Lions tour to Australia, Australia A played host to the British & Irish Lions in a mid-week game and offered fringe Wallabies players a chance to impress the national selectors ahead of the test series. Australia A won the match 28–25, inflicting the Lions' first loss of the tour.

Australia A next formed in 2003 as part of the 2003 Rugby World Cup warm-ups and 2003 June rugby union tests, where they faced Japan in back-to-back matches coming away with two victories in Osaka and Tokyo. Up until 2004, Australia A was used as a team to offer touring teams a chance to play mid-week matches or developing rugby nations a chance to play stronger opposition to maintain non-test match status. However, in November 2004, Australia A was used when the Wallabies toured Europe, whereby they played the French Barbarians in the lead up to the national sides meeting later on tour in Paris.

By 2005, Australia A had won every match they had played in, but after playing the Junior All Blacks (the All Blacks second team at the time) in 2005, their unbeaten run came to an end, losing 23–19 in Canberra.

In 2006, Australia was originally invited to take part in the inaugural IRB Pacific Nations Cup but decided against sending a team, stating a need to focus on domestic competition. However, Australia did however host two games in the opening stages of the 2006 tournament, where Bluetongue Central Coast Stadium hosted Tonga vs Fiji and later Tonga vs Samoa. Australia A later played two matches against Fiji after the 2006 tournament, and then joined the competition in 2007.

In the 2007 Pacific Nations Cup, Australia A played 5 matches for 3 wins, 1 draw, and 1 loss. The team finished second in the tournament won by the Junior All Blacks.

In the 2008 Pacific Nations Cup, Australia A played 5 matches for 4 wins and 1 loss. The team finished second in the tournament won by New Zealand Māori. At the end of the 2008, however, the Australian Rugby Union decided to scrap the Australia A team, citing financial constraints. Australia withdrew from the 2009 tournament.

Despite withdrawing from the Australia A programme, between 2009 and 2010, Australia fielded several XV sides against Home Nations clubs, and although not officially titled Australia A, the side was often referred to it with these games used for fringe Wallabies players. For the 2010 England tour to Australia, the ARU arranged for the Australian Barbarians Rugby Club to play two matches against the visiting England national team. This side was nominated as the second national team and was, as such, essentially Australia A by another name for the England matches. The Australian Barbarians also played a pre-World Cup friendly against Canada in 2011.

Australia XV also returned in 2016, when they played against the French Barbarians during the Wallabies Spring tour. The side was selected from a handful of fringe players and with the team not being the official Wallabies side, the selectors were able to select players from outside the Australian Rugby Union selection policy and chose players based in Europe.

In February 2020, Rugby Australia had hinted at a possible return of the Australia A side where they would face Tier 2 opposition to strengthen the sides. However, any possible plans where paused due the COVID-19 pandemic, and in May 2022 having not formally participated in any event since 2008, the Australia A team was reignited by Rugby Australia to compete in the Pacific Nations Cup for July 2022 against Fiji, Samoa and Tonga, to take place in Fiji.

Results
Scores highlighted in red color denoted a loss.

Other matches
Matches played by the Australian Barbarians Club or Australia XV when selected as the second national team:

Squad  
On 21 September, a 34-player squad was named for Australia A's 3-match tour against a Japan XV side.

Head coach:  Jason Gilmore

List of Coaches

 Eddie Jones (2001, vs. British & Irish Lions tour)
 Adrian Thompson (2003, vs. Japan)
 Eddie Jones (2004, vs. French Barbarians)
 Ewen McKenzie (2005, vs. Junior All Blacks)
 Eddie Jones (2005, vs. French Barbarians)
 Laurie Fisher (2006, vs. Fiji)
 John Connolly (2006 European Tour)
 Laurie Fisher (2007, Pacific Nations Cup)
 Phil Mooney (2008 Pacific Nations Cup)
 Robbie Deans (2009 European Tour)
 Robbie Deans (2010 England Series)
 Robbie Deans (2010 European Tour)
 Scott Wisemantel (2016, vs. French Barbarians)
 Jason Gilmore (2022 Pacific Nations Cup & Japan tour)

See also

 The Wallabies

Notes

References

External links

Eight Wallabies to start for Australia A, as Campbell debuts as captain
Strong team named for Australia A clash with Japan

Australia national rugby union team
Second national rugby union teams